Sissy is a pejorative for an effeminate boy or man.

Sissy may also refer to:

People named, nicknamed or codenamed Sissy 
 Sissy van Alebeek (born 1976), Dutch cyclist
 Martha Sissy Biggers (born 1957), American chef
 Rachel Dübendorfer (1900-1973), World War II resistance fighter codenamed "Sissy"
 Frances Farenthold (born 1926), American former politician, attorney, activist and educator
 Sissy Höfferer (born 1955), Austrian actress
 Sissy Löwinger (1941–2011), Austrian actress
 Sylvia Sissy Raith (born 1960), German football coach and former player
 Elizabeth Sissy Schwarz (born 1936), Austrian figure skater
 Sissy Spacek (born 1949), American actress
 Elisabeth Theurer (born 1956), Austrian equestrian
 Elisabeth Waldheim (1922–2017), First Lady of Austria from 1986 to 1992

Other uses
 Sissy, Aisne, a commune in France
 Sissy (film), a 2022 Australian film
 Sissy: A Coming-of-Gender Story, a book by Jacob Tobia
 SIZZY, a Thai girl group whose former name was "SISSY"
 The submissive participant in feminization
 Sissy squat, a form of squat exercise

See also
 The Sissies, an American pop-punk band
 Cissy (disambiguation)
 Sissi (disambiguation)

Feminine given names
Lists of people by nickname